The A. N. Tanner House is a historic two-story house in Grouse Creek, Utah. It was built with red bricks in 1899 by Allen N. Tanner, a farmer who lived here with his wife, née Mary Emily Barlow, and their nine children; the Tanners were Mormons. The house was designed in the Georgian Revival architectural style. When Tanner died in 1935, and the house remained in his family in the 1980s. It has been listed on the National Register of Historic Places since February 11, 1982.

References

		
National Register of Historic Places in Box Elder County, Utah
Georgian Revival architecture in Utah
Houses completed in 1899
1899 establishments in Utah